Keoladeo National Park or Keoladeo Ghana National Park (formerly known as the Bharatpur Bird Sanctuary) is a famous avifauna sanctuary in Bharatpur, Rajasthan, India, that hosts thousands of birds, especially during the winter season. Over 350 species of birds are known to be resident. It is also a major tourist centre with scores of ornithologists arriving here in the hibernal season. It was declared a protected sanctuary in 1971 and established as a national park on 10 March 1982. Keoladeo National Park is also a UNESCO World Heritage Site.

Keoladeo Ghana National Park is a man-made and man-managed wetland and one of the national parks of India. The reserve protects Bharatpur from frequent floods, provides grazing grounds for village cattle, and earlier was primarily used as a waterfowl hunting ground. The  reserve is locally known as Ghana, and is a mosaic of dry grasslands, woodlands, woodland swamps and wetlands. These diverse habitats are home to 366 bird species, 379 floral species, 50 species of fish, 13 species of snakes, 5 species of lizards, 7 amphibian species, 7 turtle species and a variety of other invertebrates.

History

The sanctuary was created 250 years ago and is named after a Keoladeo (Shiva) temple within its boundaries. Initially, it was a natural depression; and was flooded after the Ajan Bund was constructed by Maharaja Suraj Mal, then the ruler of the princely state of Bharatpur, between 1726 and 1763. The bund was created at the confluence of two rivers, the Gambhir and Banganga. The park was a hunting ground for the Maharajas of Bharatpur, a tradition dating back to 1850, and duck shoots were organised yearly in honour of the British viceroys. In one shoot alone in 1938, over 4,273 birds such as mallards and teals were killed by Lord Linlithgow, then Viceroy of India.

The park was established as a national park on 10 March 1982. Previously the private duck shooting preserve of the Maharaja of Bharatpur since the 1850s, the area was designated as a bird sanctuary on 13 March 1976 and a Ramsar site under the Ramsar Convention in October 1981.

The last big shoot was held in 1964 but the Maharajah retained shooting rights until 1972. In 1985, the Park was declared a UNESCO World Heritage Site under the World Heritage Convention. It is a reserve forest under the Rajasthan Forest Act, 1953 and therefore, is the property of the State of Rajasthan of the Indian Union. In 1982, grazing was banned in the park, leading to violent clashes between local farmers and the government.

World Heritage Site

To be included on the World Heritage List, sites must be of outstanding universal value and meet at least one out of ten selection criteria. These criteria are explained in the Operational Guidelines for the Implementation of the World Heritage Convention which, besides the text of the convention, is the main working tool on World Heritage. The criteria are regularly revised by the committee to reflect the evolution of the World Heritage concept itself.  The UNESCO convention for listing goes on to explain the criteria the selection of Keoladeo Ghana National Park as a World Heritage Site under the Natural Criteria iv of Operational Guidelines 2002 and the description which follows is that the park is a "Habitat of rare and endangered species. The park is a wetland of international importance for migratory waterfowl. It is the wintering ground for the rare Siberian crane and habitat for large numbers of resident nesting birds". According to the revised Operational Guidelines of 2005, the park falls under Criteria (x) which states that to be conferred the status of World Heritage, the site should "contain the most important and significant natural habitats for in-site conservation of biological diversity, including those containing threatened species of outstanding universal value from the point of view of science or conservation".

Geography
It is spread over approx . One third of the Keoladeo National Park is wetland with mounds, dykes, and open water with or without submerged or emergent plants. The uplands have grasslands with tall grass species together with scattered trees and shrubs present in varying density.
A similar habitat with short grasses, such as Cynodon dactylon and Dichanthium annulatum also exists. Woodlands with thickets of huge Kadam trees (Neolamarckia cadamba) are distributed in scattered pockets. The park’s flora consists of 379 species of flowering plants of which 96 are wetland species. The wetland is a part of the Indo-Gangetic Great Plains.

Water remains only in some depressions. This alternate wetting and drying helps to maintain the ecology of the freshwater swamp, ideal for water-fowl and resident water birds. Arrangement to pump water from deep tube wells to fill small depressions to save seeds, spores and other aquatic life also exist. They are also helpful in extreme years of drought.

Climate

Mean relatively humidity varied from 62% in March to 83.3% in December. In 1988, only  of rain fell during 32 days.

Ecology

Flora

In an area characterized by sparse vegetation, the park is the only spot which has dense vegetation and trees. The principal vegetation types are tropical dry deciduous forests intermixed with dry grasslands. Where the forest has degraded, the greater part of the area is covered with shrubs and medium-sized trees. The park is a freshwater swamp and is flooded during the monsoon. The rest of the area remains dry. Forests, mostly in the north-east of the park, are dominated by kalam or kadam (Mitragyna parvifolia), jamun (Syzygium cumini) and babul (Acacia nilotica). The open woodland is mostly babul with a small amount of kandi (Prosopis cineraria) and ber (Zizyphus).

It is unlikely that the site would support such numbers of waterfowl as it does without the addition of water from Ajan Bund, a human-made impoundment. Soils are predominantly alluvial, some clay has formed as a result of the periodic inundations.

The open woodland is mostly babul with a small amount of kandi and ber. Scrublands are dominated by ber and karira (Capparis decidua).

Piloo (Salvadora oleoides and Salvadora persica) are also present in the park and happens to be virtually the only woody plants found in areas of saline soil. The aquatic vegetation is rich and provides a valuable food source for waterfowl.

During 2007 and 2008 attempts were made to eradicate the mesquite Prosopis juliflora and specimens of the asteraceous genus Cineraria to prevent the park being overrun with these invasive species and to assist natural vegetation in recovering.

Fauna

Macro invertebrates such as worms, insects, and mollusks, though more abundant in variety and numbers than any other group of organisms, are present mostly in aquatic habitats. They are food for many fish and birds, as well as some animal species, and hence, constitute a major link in the food chain and functioning of the ecosystem. Land insects are in abundance and have a positive effect on the breeding of land birds.

Birds 

The park's location in the Gangetic Plain makes it an unrivalled breeding site for:
 herons,
 storks and
 cormorants,
and an important wintering ground for large numbers of migrant
 ducks.
The most common waterfowl are:
 gadwall,
 shoveler,
 common teal,
 cotton teal,
 tufted duck,
 knob-billed duck,
 Bar-headed goose,
 little cormorant,
 great cormorant,
 Indian shag,
 ruff,
 painted stork,
 white spoonbill,
 Asian open-billed stork,
 oriental ibis,
 darter,
 common sandpiper,
 wood sandpiper,
 green sandpiper,
 greater flamingos,
 spot-billed pelican,
 great white pelican,
 demoiselle cranes, and
 the sarus cranes, with its spectacular courtship dance, also lives here.

Keoladeo National Park is known as a "bird paradise", since more than 370 bird species have been recorded in the park. Ornithologically, the park assumes significance in two respects: One because of its strategic location as a staging ground for migratory waterfowl arriving in the Indian subcontinent before dispersing to various regions. Further waterfowl converge here before departing to breeding grounds in the western Palearctic region. In addition, the wetland is a wintering area for massive congregations of waterfowl. It is also the only regular wintering area in India for the:
 Siberian crane.
Birds present include:
 warblers,
 babblers,
 bee-eaters,
 bulbuls,
 buntings,
 chats,
 painted francolins and
 quails,
 Indian grey hornbill and
 Marshall's iora.
 Raptors include:
 osprey,
 peregrine falcon,
 Pallas' sea eagle,
 short-toed eagle,
 tawny eagle,
 imperial eagle,
 spotted eagle and
 crested serpent eagle.
 The greater spotted eagle has recently been recorded breeding here, a new breeding record for the species in India.

Mammals 

Mammalian fauna of Keoladeo National Park is equally rich with 27 identified species.
 Primates include:
 rhesus macaque and
 Hanuman langur.
 nilgai,
 feral cattle and
 chital deer are common while
 sambar
are few. Other:
 ungulates present include:
 blackbuck,
 Indian hog deer and
 Wild boar.
 Indian porcupine
are often spotted sneaking out of the park into crop fields. Two:
 mongoose species,
 the small Indian mongoose and
 the common Indian gray mongoose,
are occasionally sighted.
 Cat species present include:
 jungle cat,
 leopard cat and
 fishing cat.
 The Asian palm civet and
 the small Indian civet
are also present, but rarely sighted. Large predators are absent, but:
 small carnivores include:
 Bengal fox,
 golden jackals and
 striped hyena.
 The smooth-coated otter
can be seen attacking birds such as:
 coots.
Many species of:
 rats,
 mice,
 gerbils and
 bats
are also found in the park.

Other species 
Fish fauna of the park comprises 43 species, of which 37 enter the park along with the water from Ajan Bund, and six species are breeding residents. During a good rainy season the park receives around 65 million fish fry and fingerlings. The fish population and diversity are of high ecological importance as they form the food source of many birds.

The herpetofauna of Keoladeo National Park is diverse. Out of the ten species of turtles that are seen in Rajasthan, seven are present in this park. Besides this, there are five lizard species, thirteen snake species and seven species of amphibians.  The bullfrog and skipper frog are commonly found in the wetlands.  It is often easy to see a python out of its burrow and basking in the sun on a sunny winter day.  The common monitor lizard, Indian porcupine and bi-colored leaf-nose bat have been seen in the same burrow as that of the python. The venomous snakes found in the park are krait, cobra and Russell’s viper.

Management

The management objective is to allow the area to flood and dry out annually, rather than be maintained as a system of permanent marshes. Water for the wetlands is supplied from the dam outside the park boundaries. Usually, some 14.17 million cubic meters of water is the estimated annual requirement of the park. The water level inside the park is regulated by means of dykes and artificial embankments. The alternative arrangement of water in case of emergencies such as danger of marshes and water bodies drying out completely is ensured through four boreholes so that survival of the aquatic flora and fauna is not endangered before the arrival of monsoon. The boundaries of the park are clearly delineated by a thirty-two Kilometer long boundary encircling the park restricting the encroachment of humans and domestic cattle inside the perimeters of the park. The road from Bharatpur town which used to intersect the park was also closed and relocated outside the boundary to reduce the disturbance by visitors from the town which helped in bringing down the levels of pollution inside the park considerably. As opposed to most of the national parks in India and elsewhere, Bharatpur Bird sanctuary has no buffer zone. Due to the heavy density of population and more than 15 villages settled on the periphery of park, it was impossible for authorities to create a buffer zone around the bird sanctuary. Grazing and collection of firewood and grass was phased out from the park as far back as 1983.

Constraints
The Siberian crane, which formerly lived throughout the entire Indo-Gangetic plains of India, is reported to be no longer found in the area. Its absence has been attributed to hunting by nomadic tribes along the species' 5,000 mile migration route from Siberia to Bharatpur.

Some 2,500 cattle and domestic water buffalo were allowed in the area up until November 1982 when grazing was banned. Predictably, the ban led to a buildup of local resentment, resulting in an attempted forced entry into the park. Police opened fire and eight people were killed: tensions still remain high. The absence of grazing is causing management problems as vegetation, principally Paspalum distichum, a perennial amphibious grass, blocks up the channels. The Rajasthan government has rejected a proposal from the Bombay Natural History Society to allow limited grazing, since this would conflict with the law. Furthermore, recycled nutrients from the large quantity of dung deposited by livestock probably supported considerable numbers of insects.

The presence of some 700 feral cattle within the park is cause for concern as they compete with wildlife for valuable forage. Larvae of the Lepidopteran Parapoynx diminutalis has also been a serious pest, and considerably inhibited the growth of Nymphoides cristatum during June–July 1986. High levels of pollutants in Ajan Bund are believed to be responsible for the increasing number of piscivorous birds seen in a dazed state and unable to fly. Fewer birds were recorded in 1984 than in previous years. Four sarus cranes and 40 ring-necked doves were found dead outside the park during 1988 and early 1989, possibly due to pesticide poisoning, and a study of the impact of pesticide use in surrounding areas on the park has been initiated in addition to studies on heavy metal contamination. Disturbance from visitors can be a cause for concern, especially during December and January when visitors come to see the cranes.

A non-native water hyacinth Icornia species was introduced in 1961, and has now proliferated to the extent that it is blocking the artificial waterways and filling the impoundments. This is significantly altering the habitat for many bird species, and is a serious management problem. Attempts to control the species have been ineffectual to date.

Tourism and visitor facilities
By virtue of being one of the best bird watching sites of Asia, more than 100,000 visitors come to the park every year. The range of visitors varies from very serious birdwatchers to school children. Of the visitors, 45,000 are foreign tourists. In addition, the location of the park is such that tourists visiting Agra, Fatehpur Sikri and Jaipur invariably stop over at Bharatpur. The park opens from sunrise to sunset around the year. Food and accommodation facilities are available within the precincts of the park. The only accommodation inside the Keoladeo National Park is available in the property of government Bharatpur Ashoka Forest Lodge and lesser expensive Shanti Kutir, which is maintained and run by the ITDC. Bharatpur Forest Lodge is a quaint hotel in the vicinity of natural treasure trove of the park and has a total of 16 rooms to offer to visitors. Its circuit house and dak bungalow also offer good accommodation options. Visitors coming to Bharatpur can also stay in palaces, havelis and other heritage properties converted into hotels. It is always advisable to have one’s accommodation pre-booked, especially so during winters. An array of 3 star hotels and resorts are also located in the vicinity of the park where visitors can stay cozily. Besides the normal tourism activities and self-arranged bird watching tours of the Keoladeo National Park, visitors can also opt for a tour of this birding destination by selecting from an array of luxury tourist train services. Luxury trains like Palace on Wheels include Bharatpur Bird Sanctuary in its tour itinerary.

Scientific research and facilities

The Bombay Natural History Society (BNHS) has done considerable work in the area, including the ringing of birds for the last 40 years. The society has recently intensified its operations and has established a hydro-biological station to monitor the ecology of the wetland. Particular attention will be given to any in dramatic change in the vegetation following the ban on grazing. Limnological studies have been carried out by the Zoology Department of the University of Rajasthan, Jaipur. The park authorities are monitoring the bird populations. A documentary film 'Indian birds of the monsoon' was produced by S. and B. Breeden in 1979–1980. The park has considerable potential for education, more so than other wetland sites in India, in view of it being relatively near to the cities of Agra, Delhi and Jaipur.

Between December 1992 and January 1995, a collaborative project between the Governments of India and Russia, International Crane Foundation and Wild Bird Society of Japan was set up to save the Siberian crane. The project focused on releasing captivity bred cranes into the wild, tracking migratory routes of common cranes, and building up the resident crane population in the park. Although the project did not yield the desired results, the successful survival of introduced cranes in the park has given sufficient hope to develop a viable resident population in the future.

Crisis of 2007
A severe drought caused severe harm to the park and its flora and fauna in 2007.

A proposal for water supply to Keoladeo National Park, Bharatpur was forwarded by the Government of Rajasthan seeking assistance from Planning Commission as advised and approved by the Ministry of Environment and Forests (MoEF) vide their letter dated 10.04.2008.  As per the MoEF, the proposal is beyond the purview of the existing centrally sponsored scheme of the MoEF, seems to be viable and has the potential to put an end to the eternal water scarcity in Bharatpur National Park.

The Keoladeo National Park is a Ramsar Wetland Site and a World Heritage Site.  Due to acute water scarcity, the ecosystem of the Park has been affected badly and this has resulted in reduction in the arrival of migratory birds in the National Park. Water supply is essential for the National Park, which is a wetland and a Ramsar site facing acute shortage of water for the last few years.  Currently, apart from rainfall the Park receives water from "Ajan Bund", a temporary reservoir via the Dakan canal.  Through a small canal dug last year water from Khokhar Weir (Bees Mora) is also available. The total requirement of water for the Park is estimated at 14.17 million cubic meters (500 MCft).  The supply from Ajan Bund is irregular and subject to the bund being full to the extent of reservoir level at 8.5 meters. During the last several years either water is not supplied or supplied insufficiently.

The project had been prepared to keep in view the need for 400 MCFT of water during late July to August, for a period of 30 days to the Park which is to be had by diverting and lifting flood waters of Yamuna.  The project thus covered diversion of water during monsoon through underground pipes with lifting arrangements over a length of 16 km from the off-take point of Goverdhan drain near Santruk village.  The estimated cost of the project as proposed by the State Government was to the tune of Rs. 650 million. The project proposed was to channelize water from Govardhan drain to meet the water deficit of KNP during the months of July to September at the time of requirement.  The major components of the project were construction of a head regulator with control gate at the drain located in the state, raw water reservoir with capacity of 13,000 m, 3 pump houses, DG sets for pumping station and laying and testing of /PCC/MS pipelines.

See also
 Arid Forest Research Institute (AFRI)
 Kanwar Taal Bird Sanctuary
 Sultanpur Bird Sanctuary

References

External links

Ramsar sites in India
Protected areas established in 1971
Tourist attractions in Bharatpur district
World Heritage Sites in India
1971 establishments in Rajasthan
National parks in Rajasthan